A New World is Maksim Mrvica's third international album release. It was released on September 12, 2005.

Track listing
New World Concerto (from New World Symphony) (Antonín Dvořák) - 4:18
Nostradamus (Tonči Huljić) - 3:39
Dido's Lament (Henry Purcell) - 3:24
Tosca (Giacomo Puccini) - 3:05
Desert Skies (Tonči Huljić) - 4:00
Intermezzo (Pietro Mascagni) - 3:53
Somewhere in Time/The Old Woman (John Barry) - 5:56
Ride of the Valkyries (Richard Wagner) - 4:37
Still Waters (Tonči Huljić) - 3:34
Blue Balloon (Joseph Brooks) - 3:49 
Mojito (Tonči Huljić) - 3:11
The Flower Duet (Léo Delibes) - 3:10
Deborah's Theme (from Once Upon a Time in America) (Ennio Morricone) - 4:38 Bonus material
Kolibre (backing track) - 3:47
Claudine (backing track) - 4:29
Nostradamus (backing track) - 3:21 Enhanced element
A New World EPK Video (directed by Paul Bates)

There are also promotional piano scores of Claudine, Kolibre and Nostradamus available with the enhanced CD.

External links
"A New World"
Toshiba-EMI Maksim's Japan site

Maksim Mrvica albums
2005 albums